Josep Tolosa i Carreras, (Girona, November 20, 1846 – Barcelona, April 28, 1916) was a Catalan physician, chess writer and player.

He was a pupil of Joan Carbó i Batlle, and master of Josep Paluzie i Lucena and Valentí Marín i Llovet. He was a member in the chess clubs of Café del Recreo and Cafè Anglès.

Works
Articles in the publication Teoría y práctica del ajedrez, 1867
Articles in the publication La Ilustración, 1883
Articles in the publication Sportsmen's Club, 1904–1905
 Traité analytique du probleme d'échecs (Paris, 1892)
 Ruy López, (Barcelona, 1896–1899)

External links
 www.chessgames.com

1826 births
1916 deaths
Physicians from Catalonia
Writers from Catalonia
Spanish chess writers
Spanish chess players
Spanish writers in French
Spanish medical writers
19th-century chess players